Reinelt is a surname. Notable people with the surname include:

Maximilian Reinelt (1988–2019), German rower and physician
Robbie Reinelt (born 1974), English footballer
Sascha Reinelt (born 1973), German field hockey player

See also
Reinert